TV listings (television listings, also sometimes called a TV guide or program/programme guide) are a printed or electronic timetable of television programs. Often intended for consumer use, these provide information concerning programming scheduled to be broadcast on various television channels available to the reader – either via terrestrial, free-to-air, cable, satellite or over-the-top MVPD – indicating at what time and on what channel they are due to be broadcast over a period usually encompassing about seven- to 14-days in advance.

Overview
Since the early days of television, such listings have been printed in local newspapers, newspaper inserts, or magazines (including specialized listings magazines), but are now often viewed as electronic program guides available on set-top boxes and most digital TV sets.

Most print listings publications originally displayed programming information a text-based format modeled after program logs maintained by local broadcasters, which organized programs first by their scheduled airtime and secondarily by channel, a format that allowed complete program titles and synopses of reasonable detail to be incorporated into the guide. With the formation of other broadcast and subscription channels in subsequent years, set space requirements resulted in detailed synopses being gradually restricted to series and specials – usually those airing in evening timeslots – as well as movies.

Since the 1980s, grids – which organize listings primarily by channel in correspondence to airtime – have become the common format for displaying listings information, as it allows more space to display programming data for an expanded lineup of channels. Many national and local TV listings magazines (such as TV Guide in the United States) originally incorporated grids to show prime time listings, but would eventually begin expanding them to encompass the full broadcast day during the late 1980s and 1990s. For print publications, space requirements have largely limited the availability and detail of programming information that can be incorporated into a grid format; however, because web- and application-based APIs can fit more information into such a structure, the format does allow for detailed synopses to be included into a grid. However, most websites and mobile apps offering program listings usually incorporate synopses and other information concerning a specific television program in a clickable or swipeable dialog box.

Program listings data is compiled by various metadata providers throughout the world, which provide data to specific regions or countries. The most prominent provider of television program metadata is Gracenote, which assumed most responsibilities for program metadata dissemination from Tribune Media Services, following Tribune Media's acquisition of Gracenote (now owned by Nielsen), in 2014. Gracenote's On Entertainment service provides TV listings and synopses for approximately 85 countries – including the United States and Canada – and 35 languages, and maintains a database of program data for approximately six million television series and movies for guidance for various websites and electronic programming guides. Within the United Kingdom, Press Association, Red Bee Media Broadcasting Dataservices, REDNI and DigiGuide serve as the major providers of television listings metadata.

History

United Kingdom
On 1 March 1991, the monopoly on listings magazines ended and the market was opened up. Before this, there were two magazines on the market: Radio Times, began in 1923, for BBC listings and TV Times, began in 1955, for ITV and, from 1982, Channel 4 and S4C listings. A number of magazines appeared on the market at that time: TV Quick, What's on TV and the short-lived TV Plus. By the mid-1990s What's on TV was Britain's best-selling weekly magazine but in 2008 a rival publication, TV Choice (began in 1999 by Bauer Media Group) achieved a higher circulation. TV Choice has a similar design and format but at a lower price.

Traditionally these have been simple broadcast programming lists of what appears in chronological order on the various channels available, having been designed for an age in which there were only a few channels, and where the only medium was paper. Today, with 600 channels in the UK today, the Internet offers different formats and possibilities for TV listings and television is starting to appear in both mobile and internet formats, so the whole approach to TV listings is changing. In addition, most UK newspapers publish a full week's listings guide in their Saturday and Sunday editions.

United States

Print listings
The first television program guide to be published in the US was released by New York City television station WNBT (now NBC owned-and-operated station WNBC) in June 1941; the station mailed "program cards" containing programming information for the week of 30 June to 5 July, to local owners of television sets. The program cards were attached with an "opinion card" at the bottom of the guide, which NBC asked owners to fill out and mail to the network.

The first local "television guide books" first began publication during 1948: Television Forecast in Chicago, the Local Televiser in Philadelphia, and the TeleVision Guide in New York City. The former of the three was the first continuously published television listings magazine, when Television Forecast first became sold on newsstands on 9 May 1948. Founder Les Viahon and three other partners bankrolled the venture with an initial funding round of $250 each; they initially published Television Forecast in the basement classroom of Abbot Hall at Northwestern University, and bounded the inaugural issue with staplers borrowed from Northwestern professors. First sold on 14 June 1948, The TeleVision Guide was founded by MacFadden Publications and Cowles Media Company circulation director Lee Wagner. During the late 1940s and early 1950s, Wagner began publishing regional editions of The TeleVision Guide for New England and the Baltimore–Washington area. Brothers Irvin and Arthur Borowsky, co-founders of the North American Publishing Company, began publishing the Local Televiser (which was subsequently retitled Philadelphia TV Digest following its initial issues) on 7 November 1948, with the intent of using the publication to serve as a promotional tool to increase television sales by way of a commitment from local distributors of Philco television sets to pay 50% of the publishing costs and the provision of television set ownership lists. Many local newspapers throughout the United States also began publishing weekly listings guides for distribution as supplements in their Sunday editions, eventually extending to daily schedule inserts within the lifestyles/entertainment sections of their weekday editions.

In the winter of early 1953, Wagner sold The TeleVision Guide to Philadelphia-based newspaper and magazine publisher Walter Annenberg, who folded the magazine into his multimedia company Triangle Publications. (Wagner would serve as a consultant for its successor national magazine until 1963.) Triangle concurrently purchased numerous regional television listing publications including TV Forecast, TV Digest and the Local Televiser, intending to develop a national television magazine. Wagner's publication served as the prototype for TV Guide (originally adopted as the renaming of the New York-based TeleVision Guide on 18 March 1950), which Triangle first released as a national publication on 3 April of that year, with a cover story about Lucille Ball and Desi Arnaz's newborn son Desi Arnaz, Jr., who was referred to under the headline: "Lucy's $50,000,000 baby". 1.56 million copies of the digest-sized first issue were sold across ten U.S. cities.

While the initial issue was an almost instant success, TV Guides circulation decreased with subsequent issues, even as the magazine's distribution expanded to five additional cities (Pittsburgh, Rochester, Detroit, Cleveland and San Francisco) throughout the summer of 1953. Sales of TV Guide began to reverse course with the 4–10 September 1953, "Fall Preview" issue, which had an average circulation of 1,746,327 copies; by the mid-1960s, TV Guide had become the most widely circulated magazine in the United States.

Print TV listings were a common feature of newspapers from the late-1950s to the mid-2000s.  With the general decline of newspapers and the rise of digital TV listings as well as on-demand watching, TV listings have slowly began to be withdrawn since 2010.  The New York Times removed its TV listings from its print edition in September 2020.

Electronic and interactive program guides
As cable television grew in distribution across the United States, methods to provide alternatives to print television listings began to be developed. In 1981, Tulsa, Oklahoma-based United Video Satellite Group (later Gemstar-TV Guide International) launched the first widely distributed electronic program guide service in North America, in the form of a cable channel known simply as the Electronic Program Guide (EPG). (Some cable providers had maintained their own in-house EPGs dating to the late 1970s.) The channel – which eventually evolved into the general entertainment network Pop – was developed with the creation of a software application sold to cable television providers in the United States and Canada to provide 24-hour-a-day program listings in a scrolling grid format to their subscribers on a dedicated cable channel. It had the ability to display programming information up to 90 minutes in advance, utilizing raw listings data supplied via satellite to a computer unit installed in the headend facilities of participating systems to present that data to subscribers in a format customized to the system's channel lineup. The initial grid covered the entire screen and was programmed to provide four hours of listings information suited to each system's entire channel lineup, uploaded and displayed one half-hour period at a time. The EPG software was originally designed only to generate video, resulting in cable operators uplinking a local FM radio station or a cable-originated audio service provider (such as Cable Radio Network) to serve as the channel's audio feed.

An "optional" software upgrade released for the Amiga 1000-based EPG Sr. in 1987, incorporated a modified listings grid that was confined to the lower half of the screen. The split-screen configuration allowed for static or animated graphical advertisements for local and national businesses and logos (primarily for promotions for cable channels carried by the local system) to be created locally by each cable system operator and uploaded to the software to fill the video feed's upper half. In 1988, United Video made further upgrades to the revised EPG Sr. software (then renamed the Prevue Guide, later known as TV Guide Channel and TV Guide Network), and integrated the system with the Amiga 2000 personal computing system; the upgrades also allowed support for video and accompanying audio in the top-half video feed, allowing for video-sourced commercials and program promotions to appear in either the left or right halves of the upper-half video feed, often coupled with title, channel and airtime data to appear in the opposing halves.

In 1986, Chris Schultheiss and engineer Peter Hallenbeck of STV/Onsat – a publishing company that had been known for distributing print listings guides – introduced SuperGuide, an interactive electronic programming guide for home satellite subscribers. The original system stored programming information (up to around one week in advance of the current date) through a locally sourced computer system, and was programmed to allow a remote control to interact with the unit. Users had to turn off the guide once they found a show they wanted to watch, and then change the channel on the satellite receiver to the appropriate service. Listings information was distributed by satellite to the SuperGuide software to the home owner's dish.

An upgraded version of SuperGuide was released in March 1990; integrated into the Uniden 4800 receiver, this version – the first commercially available unit for home use that had a locally stored guide integrated with the receiver for viewing and taping at the touch of a button – included hardware that allowed storage of up to two weeks of programming information and permitted users to access the channel carrying the show they wanted to watch or set it to record (controlling a VCR unit via an infrared output) by remote.

In June 1988, Eli Reiter, Michael H. Zemering and Frank Shannon were awarded a patent for an interactive program guide (IPG) that allowed users to search programming information by title or category. In 1996, Prevue Networks (the parent of what, by that point, had become the Prevue Channel) introduced Prevue Interactive (later known as TV Guide Interactive and then iGuide), the first IPG service distributed in the United States, which was initially designed for General Instrument's DCT 1000 series of set-top digital cable converter boxes.

In 1995, software company TV Host, Inc. launched the Electronic TV Host, a web-based, subscription IPG service that allowed users to download and search program listings, set reminders for programs users wanted to watch or record, and create personalized television listings pertaining to their viewing tastes. Electronic TV Host was developed as both a website and a free-to-download desktop application for Windows 95 (and later, Windows 98 and Windows 2000) that allowed users to download program listings for a monthly or annual subscription. TV Guide followed with its own web-based listings service in March 1996, with the launch of the iGuide. Originally developed by the News Corporation-MCI joint venture Delphi Internet Service Corp. as a web portal, it initially featured a mix of comprehensive television listings, news content, TV Guide editorial content and a search feature called CineBooks, which allowed users to access detailed information on about 30,000 film titles. In January 1997, iGuide was relaunched as the TV Guide Entertainment Network (TVGEN; later renamed TV Guide Online in 2002), refocusing on television, music, movies and sports listings and information, along with wire news and features from Reuters, Daily Variety and The New York Post, free e-mail updates for registered users, and a chat room that was developed to accommodate 5,000 users simultaneously.

List of TV listings magazines

Currently published

Australia

Canada

France

Germany

Ireland

Italy

Japan

New Zealand

Portugal

Russia

United Kingdom

United States

Defunct

Australia

Bulgaria

Canada

Italy

Philippines

Romania

United Kingdom

United States

List of TV listings websites

Current

Australia

Canada

Italy

South Korea

Sweden

United Kingdom

United States

Defunct

Canada

United Kingdom

United States

References

Listings